Simon may refer to:

People
 Simon (given name), including a list of people and fictional characters with the given name Simon
 Simon (surname), including a list of people with the surname Simon
 Eugène Simon, French naturalist and the genus authority Simon

 Tribe of Simeon, one of the twelve tribes of Israel
 Herbert A. Simon, political scientist

Places
 Şimon, a village in Bran Commune, Braşov County, Romania
 Șimon, a right tributary of the river Turcu in Romania

Arts, entertainment, and media

Films
 Simon (1980 film), starring Alan Arkin
 Simon (2004 film), Dutch drama directed by Eddy Terstall

Games
 Simon (game), a popular computer game 
 Simon Says, children's game

Literature
 Simon (Sutcliff novel), a children's historical novel written by Rosemary Sutcliff
 Simon (Sand novel), an 1835 novel by George Sand
 Simon Necronomicon (1977), a purported grimoire written by an unknown author, with an introduction by a man identified only as "Simon"

Music
 Simon (album), an album by the band Gruvis Malt
Simon (EP), an EP by Dirty Little Rabbits

Television
 Simon (French TV series), a 2016 French animated children's television series
 Simon (American TV series), a 1995 American sitcom
 Simon & Simon, 1980s television series with brother detectives
 Simon (The Walking Dead), a fictional character from the television series The Walking Dead

Other arts, entertainment, and media
 Simon's Cat, an animated cartoon and book series
 WSMW, aka Simon FM, a radio station in Greensboro, North Carolina

Brands and enterprises
 La Maison Simons, a Quebec department store
 Simon Property Group

Electronics and technology 
 Simon (cipher)
 Simon (computer), a 1950s personal computer
 IBM Simon the first smartphone
 SIMON breach grenade, a door breaching rifle grenade

Other uses
 Simon (cat), a ship's cat who was awarded the Dickin Medal

See also 
 
 
 Justice Simon (disambiguation)
 Saint-Simon (disambiguation)
 Shimon (disambiguation)
 Shimun (disambiguation)
 Simao (disambiguation)
 Simeon (disambiguation)
 Simone (disambiguation)